Paresh Nath Kayal  is an Indian politician. He was elected from Jaynagar, West Bengal to the Lok Sabha, lower house of the Parliament of India as a member of the Indian National Congress.

References

External links
Official biographical sketch in Parliament of India website

India MPs 1952–1957
India MPs 1957–1962
India MPs 1962–1967
Lok Sabha members from West Bengal
People from Jaynagar Majilpur
1926 births
Possibly living people
People from West Bengal